The Governor's House in Peshawar, Khyber Pakhtunkhwa, Pakistan is a historic building and has a secret tunnel from the left side mosque to the Bala Hisar Fort it is about 1.25 km long, amidst what is now a park. It is close to the Peshawar Museum. It serves as the official residence of the governor of Khyber Pakhtunkhwa.

The Governor House was commissioned in the early 20th century by the British. The famous British era contractor responsible for the Mardan-Chitral Road (Lowari Pass), Attock Landi Kotal Rail track and Drosh Fort Khan Bahadur Nawab Abdul Hameed Khan of Badrashi was contracted to build the building in a traditional Greco-Roman design prevalent in other grand British buildings across India.

References

Governor's houses in Pakistan
Cultural heritage sites in Khyber Pakhtunkhwa
Buildings and structures in Peshawar
Official residences in Pakistan
Government of Khyber Pakhtunkhwa